Pachymantis dohertyi is a species of praying mantis native to Perak in Malaysia.

References

Mantidae
Mantodea of Asia
Insects described in 1890